The 1977 Tripura Legislative Assembly election took place in a single phase on 31 December 1977 to elect the Members of the Legislative Assembly (MLA) from each of the 60 Assembly Constituencies (ACs) in Tripura, India.

The Communist Party of India (Marxist) (CPI(M)), led Left front won  the election by 56 seats and formed a Government in Tripura.

Highlights
Election to the Tripura Legislative Assembly were held on December 31, 1977.  The election were held in a single phase for all the 60 assembly constituencies.

Participating Political Parties

No. of Constituencies

Electors

Performance of Women Candidates

Result

Constituency wise Winners

Government Formation
The Left Front won a majority of the 60 seats in the Legislative Assembly.  The LF was an alliance of left-wing political parties, including the Communist Party of India (Marxist) (CPI-M).  Nripen Chakraborty of the CPI-M formed a government as Chief Minister on January 5, 1978.

References

State Assembly elections in Tripura
Tripura